Brigitte Reimann (born 21 July 1933, Burg bei Magdeburg, d. 22 February 1973, East Berlin) was a German writer who is best known for her posthumously published novel Franziska Linkerhand.

Life

Brigitte Reimann was the daughter of Willi Reimann (1904–1990) and Elisabeth (1905–1992) and the oldest of four children.

She wrote her first amateur play at the age of fifteen. In 1950 she was awarded the first prize in an amateur drama competition by the Berlin theater Volksbühne. After graduating with the Abitur, Reimann worked as teacher, bookseller and reporter. Following a miscarriage in 1954, Reimann attempted suicide. In 1960 she started to work at the brown coal mine Schwarze Pumpe, where she and her second husband Siegfried Pitschmann headed a circle of writing workers. There, she wrote the narrative Ankunft im Alltag, which is regarded as a masterpiece of socialist realism. She received the Heinrich Mann prize in 1964.

When troops of the Warsaw Pact states invaded the ČSSR on 20 August 1968 as a reaction to liberalisations during the Prague Spring, Reimann refused to sign the declaration by the East German Writers' Association (DSV) approving of the measure.

On 22 February 1973, Brigitte Reimann died of cancer at the age of 39.

Her 1963 novel, Siblings (Die Geschwister), was first published in Italian translation in 2013 (by Monica Pesetti for Voland) and in English in February 2023 for Penguin.

Works
Katja. Eine Liebesgeschichte aus unseren Tagen (1953)
Der Legionär (1955)
Zwei schreiben eine Geschichte (1955)
Die Frau am Pranger (1956)
Die Kinder von Hellas (1956)
Das Geständnis (1960)
Ein Mann steht vor der Tür (1960)
Ankunft im Alltag (1961)
Sieben Scheffel Salz (1961)
Im Kombinat (1963)
Die Geschwister (1963)
Das grüne Licht der Steppen (1965)
Sonntag, den ...  (1970)
Franziska Linkerhand (incomplete novel, 1974)
Das Mädchen auf der Lotosblume (incomplete novels, 2005)
I Have No Regrets — Diaries, 1955–1963, translated by Lucy Jones

References

Links

Gravesite where Riemann was reburied in 2019
Brigitte Reimann Foundation

1933 births
1973 deaths
People from Burg bei Magdeburg
People from the Province of Saxony
East German writers
East German women
Writers from Saxony-Anhalt
20th-century German women writers
Heinrich Mann Prize winners